The Future is a 2011 German-American drama film written, directed by (her second feature), and starring Miranda July. The Future made its world premiere at the 2011 Sundance Film Festival, where it was screened in the Premieres section. The film was nominated for the Golden Bear at the 61st Berlin International Film Festival.

Plot
The story involves a couple in their mid-30s, Sophie and Jason—whose relationship is on the rocks—and their plans to adopt an injured cat. When the couple decides to adopt the stray cat, their perspective on life changes radically, testing their faith in each other and themselves.

Cast
 Miranda July as Sophie
 Hamish Linklater as Jason
 David Warshofsky as Marshall
 Isabella Acres as Gabriella
 Joe Putterlik as Joe
 Angela Trimbur as Dance studio receptionist
 Mary Passeri as Animal shelter receptionist
 Kathleen Gati as Dr. Straus
 Erinn K. Williams as Tammy
 Oona Mekas as Sasha

Background
The Future was born as a performance piece July had staged at The Kitchen and other venues in 2007.

Reception
The Future received generally positive reviews, holding a 71% "fresh" rating on Rotten Tomatoes; the consensus states "A dark and whimsical exploration of human existence that challenges viewers as much as it rewards them." On Metacritic, the film has a 67/100, indicating "generally favorable reviews". Film critic Richard Brody says that it "captures the stasis, the loneliness, the waste of an unrealized life spent in head-down pursuit" and calls it a major work of art.

The film did not perform well at the box office, grossing $568,290 in the U.S. against a $1 million budget.

References

External links
 
 
 
 
 

2011 films
2011 drama films
English-language German films
German drama films
American drama films
American independent films
Films directed by Miranda July
Films scored by Jon Brion
Films shot in California
Films shot in Los Angeles
German independent films
Roadside Attractions films
Films about cats
Films about time travel
Puppet films
2010s English-language films
2010s American films
2010s German films